Blato (often Blato na Korčuli, lit. 'Blato on Korčula') is a municipality on the island of Korčula in Croatia. It can be reached by the main island road from town of Korčula. The road runs through the forests in the middle of the island of Korčula.

Geography

The town was amphitheatrically built on several hills around a small central valley (40 km away from the town of Korčula). A long avenue of linden trees called Zlinje runs through it, along with the town public buildings (recently built: schools, hotel, bank, shops, municipal building, medical centre etc.). There is a park that provides exceptional shade during the summer months.

The climate in Blato matches the entire island of Korčula - it is located in the Adriatic which has a Mediterranean climate, characterized by long, quiet, dry and hot summer days with clear, short and mild wet winters. During the entire year the temperatures go below 10 °C in January and February, while June, July, August and September they average above 20 °C. Rainfall is typically Mediterranean, with a peak in late autumn and early winter and a minimum in July.

History
Blato got its name from a neighbouring field which flooded on regular basis, until 1911. The Blato field was occasionally drained. This created a lake that dried up during summer. The construction of canals and tunnels channelled drainage water into the sea on the north coast. It created conditions for successful exploitation of more fertile land in this region.

The town itself is one of the oldest settlements on Korčula and is situated in the middle of the western part of a field. The area of Blato is believed to have been settled during Roman times. There is a church, 'Our Lady of the Field', located on the Blato Field that has Roman floors that place its beginnings in the 4th century. Archaeological remains of Roman Junianum (agricultural estate) have been discovered. Other remains have been found in the local area dating back to prehistoric and Illyrian times.

Between World War I and World War II, phylloxera attacked the grape vines, causing them to perish en masse. This greatly contributed to the economic crisis that was happening within the newly formed Yugoslavia. Blato was facing a mass exodus. It was the sixth largest place in Dalmatia, then a region of Austro-Hungary (Blato in 1910 had a population of 7,102). During 1924 and 1925, about 890 residents abandoned their homes and left Blato. Whole families emigrated to Australia and Brazil (especially São Paulo).

During World War II Blato was bombed by the Allies.

Municipality of Blato
The Municipality of Blato, situated on the island of Korčula, administratively falls under the Dubrovnik-Neretva County. The municipality is made up of Blato and Potirna. It has access to the sea on both sides of the island. Once the main port of Blato, Prigradica is located about 3 km north of the town of Blato. The municipality's coastline is 36.3 kilometers in length. Within the area are olive trees and vineyards.

Demographics
According to the 2011 census, the Municipality of Blato has population of 3,593. The vast majority of the population are Roman Catholics.

The municipality consists of following settlements:

Blato - 3,570
Potirna - 23

Economy

During the long history of Blato, the economy has been oriented around the production of agricultural products, especially wine. Olive oil, wine, carob and fig trees are the most significant products of the region. In the early 20th century Blato produced over 1000 carts of wine and 30 wagons of olive oil for export. In addition, they produced legumes and cereals for their own use. Strong development of agriculture led to the development of ancillary services such as crafts and commercial activities.

After the Second World War, Blato began a new cycle of development. They further developed the metal industry, textile industry, tourism and the agricultural industry. The population continued to decline, albeit more slowly than before. Industrial production in Blato, in recent times has seen a down turn with the closure of the textile factory Trikop. Metal industry and agriculture remains important for the economy. Tourism now plays an important role. Hotels and private apartments in Prizba and Prigradica have given new momentum to the economy of Blato.

The main economic entities in Blato today are:

Radež Inc., a company manufacturing marine equipment and steel structures, the largest employer on the island
Blato 1902 dd company for the purchase, processing and trade of agricultural products.
Small artisans (craft and other services associated in the Association of Craftsmen)
Individual agricultural production of wine and olive oil
Tourism (rental apartments and houses for rent, hotels)
Trade (trade houses and chains)
Plumbing Blato dd
Eko doo Company for Utilities
Schools, municipalities and other government institutions and offices.

Education 
Blato Elementary School
Blato High School

Culture 
The town is known for a famous sword dance, the Kumpanija, which is performed on April 28, the day of Saint Vincenca, the town's patron saint, Blato Public library, sanctuary, ethno-museum, etc.

A bronze foundry located in Blato is one of only three bronze foundries in Croatia and the only one outside of Zagreb.

Notable people
Marija Petković, a nun who was declared blessed, the founder of Congregation of Daughters of Mercy of St. Francis, the only religious community founded in Croatia. (1892-1966)
Ivan Milat Luketa, painter, (1922-2009)
Pavle Dešpalj, classical music composer and conductor, (1934-2021)
Ante Žanetić, football player and Olympic gold medalist, (1936-2014)
Meri Cetinić, singer/songwriter, (b. 1953)
Ante Milostic, aka Mario, singer in Deep image band.

References

External links

 Municipality of Blato
 Tourist Association of The Municipality of Blato

Populated places in Dubrovnik-Neretva County
Korčula
Municipalities of Croatia